WPSE (stylized as WP$E) (AM 1450/FM 107.1) is a talk radio station with a focus on business that services the Erie, Pennsylvania area. It is owned by Penn State Behrend and its studio is on the campus in Erie.

Programming

Business 
WPSE carries content from Bloomberg Radio, the Dave Ramsey Show, the Lou Dobbs Financial Reports, CNBC Business Radio Reports, Gordon Deal, the Rich Eisen Show, Ken Coleman, Jill Schlesinger on Money, the Larry Kudlow Show, Motley Fool Money, CBS News Radio, FOX News Radio, Our American Stories, Real Money Pros, and commentaries by regional business leaders.

Sports 
WPSE airs sports programming including local high school football and basketball, Cleveland Browns football, Penn State football, and NFL primetime and postseason football including the Super Bowl.

References

External links
WPSE website

PSE
Business talk radio stations